Gary Alan Kolb (March 13, 1940 – July 3, 2019) was an American professional baseball player. An outfielder and utilityman, Kolb played all or parts of seven seasons (1960; 1962–65; 1968–69) of Major League Baseball with the St. Louis Cardinals, Milwaukee Braves, New York Mets and Pittsburgh Pirates.

Kolb signed with the Cardinals in 1960 after attending the University of Illinois at Urbana–Champaign. He spent much of the 1963 season with the Cardinals and batted .271 in 96 at bats. On September 29, 1963 he came in as a pinch-runner, replacing Stan Musial after Musial's final career hit. He was traded to the Braves on the eve of the 1964 campaign for catcher Bob Uecker. In part-time service over the rest of his MLB career his batting average never exceeded .218. He was a versatile performer who appeared at every position except shortstop and pitcher at the big league level (although he played every position in the minor leagues).

In his seven-season Major League career, Kolb batted .209 with six home runs and 29 runs batted in. He was the last Cardinal to wear uniform #20 before Baseball Hall of Fame outfielder Lou Brock, who was acquired two months after Kolb's trade in 1964. The number has since been retired in Brock's honor.
Kolb collected his last base hit and two RBIs in his final major league at-bat when he singled in the 8th inning on September 1, 1969.

Kolb died on July 3, 2019.

References

External links
, or Pura Pelota (Venezuelan Winter League)

1940 births
2019 deaths 
Baseball players from Illinois
Charleston Charlies players
Columbus Jets players
Denver Bears players
Florida Instructional League Pirates players
Illinois Fighting Illini baseball players
Jacksonville Suns players
Keokuk Cardinals players
Lancaster Red Roses players
Major League Baseball catchers
Major League Baseball outfielders
Major League Baseball third basemen
Milwaukee Braves players
Navegantes del Magallanes players
American expatriate baseball players in Venezuela
New York Mets players
People from Rock Falls, Illinois
Pittsburgh Pirates players
St. Louis Cardinals players
Tulsa Oilers (baseball) players
University of Illinois Urbana-Champaign alumni
Winston-Salem Red Birds players